Gundam Song Covers is a cover album by Hiroko Moriguchi, released on August 7, 2019 to commemorate the 40th anniversary of the Gundam franchise. The album features Moriguchi's versions of the 10 most popular Gundam songs, as voted on NHK's . Her song "Sora no Kanata de" from Mobile Suit Gundam: The Origin is also included as a bonus track. It was released in two physical CD versions: a regular release and a limited edition release with an LP-sized jacket with a booklet and stickers. The album cover, illustrated by Tsukasa Kotobuki, features Moriguchi dressed in an A.E.U.G normal suit, with the MSZ-006 Zeta Gundam in the background.

To promote the album, Moriguchi released the music video for "Mizu no Hoshi e Ai wo Komete" in July 2019.

Upon its release, Gundam Song Covers sold over 25,000 copies, peaked at No. 3 on Oricon's Weekly Album Chart on August 19, 2019 and charted for 57 weeks, making it Moriguchi's highest charting album in her career until Gundam Song Covers 2 hit No. 2 a year later. It was also her first top-10 album since Eternal Songs in 1991. As of September 16, 2020, the album has sold over 130,000 copies. The album was one of six recipients of the Planning Award at the 61st Japan Record Awards.

Track listing 
All tracks are arranged by Kōichirō Tokinori, except 1 by Naoki Kitajima, 2 by Kotaro Oshio, 5 by Saburō Tanooka, 6 by Satoru Shionoya, 7 by Ino Hidefumi, 10 by Kentarō Akutsu, and 11 by Takayuki Hattori.

Personnel
 Naoko Terai - violin (track 1)
 Kotaro Oshio - acoustic guitar (track 2)
 Saburo Tanooka - accordion (track 5)
 Satoru Shionoya - piano (track 6)
 Ino Hidefumi - Fender Rhodes & all instruments (track 7)
 Tairiku (of Tsukemen) - viola (track 10)
 Suguru (of Tsukumen) - piano (track 10)
 Kenta (of Tsukemen) - violin (track 10)

Charts

Sequel 

On January 23, 2020, Moriguchi and King Records announced that Gundam Song Covers 2 was being planned for a 2020 release. Fans had until February 16 to vote for which Gundam songs Moriguchi should cover on the new album. The official poll results were broadcast on the official Gundam YouTube channel on March 8, 2020. The album was originally planned for release on June 10, 2020, but due to the ongoing COVID-19 pandemic, the release date was pushed to September 16, 2020.

References

External links 
 (Hiroko Moriguchi)
 (King Records)

Gundam Song Covers on VGMdb

2019 albums
Hiroko Moriguchi albums
Covers albums
Gundam
Japanese-language albums
King Records (Japan) albums